Pierre Napoleon "Pete" Regnier (September 10, 1896–November 30, 1938) was player in the National Football League. He first played with the Minneapolis Marines during the 1921 NFL season. The following season, he played with the Green Bay Packers.

References

1896 births
1938 deaths
People from Marshall, Minnesota
Minneapolis Marines players
Green Bay Packers players
Minnesota Golden Gophers football players